America is a 2009 American made-for-television drama film directed by Yves Simoneau and starring Rosie O'Donnell, Ruby Dee and Philip Johnson. It was written by Joyce Eliason. The film is based on the young adult novel America by E. R. Frank. It premiered on February 28, 2009, on Lifetime.

Plot
A biracial 17-year-old boy named America, who has experienced a difficult life of foster care and sexual abuse, undergoes counseling with psychiatrist Maureen Brennan to help him come to terms with his painful past of childhood trauma, including growing up with and abandoned by a mother suffering from drug addiction and being shuffled through a series of foster homes including the Harpers. The film starts with Dr. Brennan at a group home where she is giving a small introduction about the outlook for most of the group home children's futures. A young America, emotionally vacant and suicidal, comes to the attention of Brennan. When Dr. Brennan tries to talk to America, he refuses to give her any answers about his childhood. Eventually Dr. Brennan helps him understand his troubled past in order to find the courage to move on and survive. Helps him to forgive and forget, in order to be able to move forward in life.

Cast
Philip Johnson as America
Rosie O'Donnell as Dr. Maureen Brennan
Ruby Dee as Mrs. Harper
Tim Rhoze as Reggie Harper
Toya Turner as America's Mother/Susana
Raquel Castro as Liza
Jade Yorker as Brooklyn
Dante Brown as Young Brooklyn (6 years old)
Michael Algieri as Young America (6 years old)
Nikolas Zilafro as a Young Boy
Logan Huffman as Marshall
Shannon Riddick as Teen
Kyle Clarington as Counselor
Kojo Asiedu as Don
Bubba Weiler as Fish
Courtney Benjamin as Sheriff Romero
David Aron Damane as Bobby Crisp
Penny Gibbs as Social Worker
Doug Hamilton as Judge
Richard Goteri as Head Cook
Dave Kilgore as Businessman (uncredited)
Dalibor Stolevski as Cook (uncredited)

Screening
The moving teledrama film of tragic but ultimately hopeful events of transformative healing based on a novel by E.R. Frank, premiered on Lifetime Television on February 28, 2009 against critical acclaim and was repeated on March 1 and 3, 2009 on the same channel.

Its showing also led to public discussion about the system of foster care. Rosie O'Donnell explained the dilemma of "aging out of the foster care system" when young people in foster care are left out of the system when they reach 18 (21 in a few U.S. states), as all services are cut. O'Donnel; explains that most of these kids end up as homeless or in jail.

DVD
The DVD of the film was released on September 1, 2009.

America (2002 novel)

The film is based on America, a young adult novel written by E.R. Frank. It tells the story of America, a fifteen-year-old biracial boy who had gotten lost in the system. The author of the book, E.R. Frank, is herself a social worker. In an author's note at the end of the book, she says she has worked with many Americas over the years.

References

External links
 

2009 television films
2009 films
2009 drama films
Films based on American novels
2000s English-language films
Films directed by Yves Simoneau
Films scored by Normand Corbeil
Lifetime (TV network) films
Sony Pictures films
American drama television films
2000s American films